Vet Stone (born Vaetta Stewart; May 2, 1950, Vallejo, California) is an American soul singer. She is the sister of Sly Stone, Rose Stone, and Freddie Stone.

She was the lead singer in the funk group Little Sister, which had a #8 R&B hit of its own in 1970 entitled "You're the One". She is currently the lead figure in a band called Family Stone (formerly called Phunk Phamily Affair). The band includes Rose Stone's daughter Lisa Stone among its members.

External links
 Little Sister website
 Family Stone website

1950 births
Living people
African-American women singers
American funk singers
Sly and the Family Stone members
American soul singers
Musicians from Vallejo, California
Singers from California
20th-century American singers
21st-century American singers
20th-century American women singers
21st-century American women singers